美川, meaning "beautiful river", may refer to:

In the Mandarin Chinese reading Měichuān:
Proposed name for Zoo Atlanta panda eventually named Xi Lan

In the Korean reading Micheon:
Micheon of Goguryeo (fl. 300–331), 15th ruler of Goguryeo

In the Japanese reading Mikawa:
Mikawa, Ehime, former town in Japan (merged in 2004)
Mikawa, Ishikawa, former town in Japan (merged in 2005)
Mikawa Station (Ishikawa), JR West railway station on the Hokuriku main line
Mikawa, Yamaguchi, former town in Japan (merged in 2006)
Kenichi Mikawa (born 1946), Japanese singer and television personality